Nguyễn Phúc Mỹ Đường (1798 – 1849) born Nguyễn Phúc Đán (阮福旦), was a prince of Nguyễn dynasty, Vietnam.

Mỹ Đường was the eldest son of Crown Prince Nguyễn Phúc Cảnh, and his mother was Tống Thị Quyên. He was granted the title Ứng Hòa Công (應和公, "Duke of Ứng Hòa") in 1817. At that time, Emperor Gia Long was old. Ministers suggested that Mỹ Đường should be appointed the Crown Prince Grandson, but was rejected by Gia Long. Later, Gia Long changed the primogeniture rule of succession, and appointed Nguyễn Phúc Đảm as successor, who became Emperor Minh Mạng.

In 1824, Mỹ Đường was apparently accused of incest with his mother, Tống Thị Quyên, by mandarin Lê Văn Duyệt, with the result that he was banished from the royal court, while his mother died in prison.

In 1833, Lê Văn Khôi revolted against the royal court in Southern Vietnam, and attempted to reestablish Prince Canh's line to the throne. Phan Huy Thực and Tôn Thất Bằng suggested that Mỹ Đường should be rehabilitated. Minh Mạng took his advice, but banished him again after the revolt was put down. His eldest son, Lệ Chung, was designated as Mỹ Thùy's heir to offer sacrifices to Prince Canh. 

Mỹ Đường died in 1849. He was rehabilitated by Tự Đức posthumously.

References

McLeod, Mark W. The Vietnamese response to French Intervention, 1862-1874 Greenwood Publishing Group, 1990 

1798 births
1849 deaths
Nguyen dynasty princes
People from Thừa Thiên-Huế province